Zbigniew Grzybowski (born January 1, 1976 in Tczew) is a retired Polish footballer.

Career
He played as a midfielder for Olympiakos Nicosia and at several Polish clubs.

References

External links
 

1976 births
Living people
Polish footballers
Polish expatriate footballers
Zawisza Bydgoszcz players
Zagłębie Lubin players
SV Wacker Burghausen players
Amica Wronki players
Górnik Łęczna players
Olympiakos Nicosia players
Górnik Polkowice players
Ekstraklasa players
2. Bundesliga players
Cypriot First Division players
Polish expatriate sportspeople in Cyprus
Polish expatriate sportspeople in Germany
Expatriate footballers in Cyprus
Expatriate footballers in Germany
People from Tczew
Sportspeople from Pomeranian Voivodeship

Association football midfielders